Buildings and structures on the Willamette University campus include:

 Art Building
 Eaton Hall
 Ford Hall
 Gatke Hall
 Hallie Ford Museum of Art
 Lausanne Hall
 Mark O. Hatfield Library
 Oregon Civic Justice Center
 Truman Wesley Collins Legal Center
 Waller Hall

See also

 List of Marylhurst University buildings
 List of Portland State University buildings
 List of Reed College buildings
 List of University of Oregon buildings
 List of University of Portland buildings

Willamette University
Willamette University
Willamette University buildings
Willamette University buildings